Tony Steward (Exley Anthony Whitefoord Steward; 27 June 1941 – 4 May 2002) was a South African cricketer. He was a right-handed batsman and a leg-break bowler, and occasional wicket-keeper. He was born and died in Durban.

Steward began playing Second XI cricket for Essex during the 1962 season, scoring a duck on his debut for the team, before making fourteen further appearances for the team before the end of the year. While he spent the following year still as a part of the Second XI, it was his consistent performances this season which brought him up to the first-team squad, for whom he made his debut first-class appearance in 1964, playing a single University Match prior to his first appearance in the County Championship a month later.

Steward batted well from the Essex lower order, frequently scoring in double-figures with tenacious partnership-building from more experienced members of the team, and making nine County Championship appearances before the season came to a close.

Steward's second and final season of first-class cricket in England came the following year, but Essex underperformed, finishing third-bottom in the 1965 County Championship table. Steward found himself out of the team and moving back to South Africa at the end of the season.

Steward made a return to cricket during the 1967–68 season, playing three games for Natal B in the Currie Cup. Nearly a decade later, he made two further appearances for South African Country Districts in miscellaneous matches.

External links
Tony Steward at Cricket Archive 

1941 births
2002 deaths
South African cricketers
Essex cricketers